"Doin' This" is a song by American country music singer Luke Combs, It was released on November 10, 2021, via River House and Columbia Nashville after he debuted the song on the CMA Awards, and after it charted from unsolicited airplay for several months, it was announced as the lead single from his third studio album Growin' Up. Combs co-wrote the song with Drew Parker and Robert Williford, and produced it with Chip Matthews and Jonathan Singleton.

Background
Combs released "Doin' This" after he performed at the 2021 CMA Awards. In a press release, Combs stated that regardless how much money or success he had, singing and songwriting was "always the plan for his life": "There was never a plan B. Once I decided that this is what I was gonna do, it's what I was gonna do whether that was at this level or at the level that I was at when I started. Music is the thing that I think makes everybody who does what I do's blood pump and gets them out of bed in the morning, and just to be able to do that and write a song about it that you feel like genuinely can connect with some of your peers is really cool".

Content
Jon Freeman of Rolling Stone described the song as "an ode to making music regardless of any fame or riches". Tricia Despres of Taste of Country stated that the lyrics means "whether he was playing in some no-name town or on the stage of the Grand Ole Opry, Combs would be doing exactly this: Playing music for all who will listen".

Music video
TA Films created the music video for "Doin' This." The video takes a "behind the scenes" approach, with a director asking Combs "If you could be doing anything, what would you be doing if you weren't doing this?" The question prompts Combs to "recall a time when a journalist asked him the very same question during an interview". Combs then goes on to tease a stadium tour and introduce his friend Adam Church, who will be joining him on his tour. Church, who is also a country music singer, attended Appalachian State University in Boone, North Carolina with Combs and McLonghorn. Combs stated to Taste of Country that Church is "a married father with an ordinary 9 to 5 kind of job who also fills up bars in western Carolina. He's a pretty big deal in Boone, N.C". The other parts show "the life of a small-town guy who never made it big", who, at the end of the video, "winds up sitting on his couch with his acoustic guitar and playing a show for two VIPS — his wife and young daughter" before Combs "welcomes him out onto a big stage to perform with him".

Chart performance
"Doin' This" peaked at number one on the Billboard Country Airplay chart dated May 21, 2022, becoming Combs' fourteenth consecutive number one single on that chart, and also becoming the first single by a solo act in six weeks to reach the top of the chart, as the previous four chart-toppers were collaborations.

Charts

Weekly charts

Year-end charts

Certifications

Release history

References

2021 singles
2021 songs
Luke Combs songs
Songs written by Luke Combs
Columbia Nashville Records singles